L'atelier du roman (English: Workshop of the Novel) is a quarterly French literary review founded in Paris in 1993 by the essayist Lakis Proguidis, and currently distributed by Groupe Flammarion and Canadian publisher Boréal.

Writers whose work has appeared in the magazine include Milan Kundera, Martin Amis, Benoît Duteurtre, Philippe Muray, Fernando Arrabal, and Michel Houellebecq.

External links 
 Site de la revue
 Catalogue de La Revue du roman sur le site des éditions Flammarion
 Chronique du Matricule des anges sur le n⁰15 (1999)

1993 establishments in France
French-language magazines
Literary magazines published in France
Magazines established in 1993
Magazines published in Paris
Quarterly magazines published in France